Graphicstudio is an art studio and print workshop at the University of South Florida in Tampa, Florida, established in 1968 by Donald Saff.

Graphicstudio with the Contemporary Art Museum and the Public Art Program form the Institute for Research in Art in the College of The Arts at the University of South Florida. With the support of then president Cecil Mackey, Saff modeled Graphicstudio after the Pratt Graphics Center, Tamarind Press, and Gemini G.E.L. The studio produced its earliest work in 1969.

Artists
Philip Pearlstein was the first artist to participate at Graphicstudio. James Rosenquist started with Graphicstudio in 1971. Richard Anuszkiewicz, Adja Yunkers, Robert Rauschenberg, and Jim Dine were also involved with Graphicstudio in the 1970s. Other artists associated with Graphicstudio over the years include Edward Ruscha, Chuck Close, Robert Mapplethorpe, Miriam Schapiro, Roy Lichtenstein, Nancy Graves, Allan McCollum, Christian Marclay, Theo Wujcik, and Vik Muniz.

Further reading
 Saff, Donald J. “Graphicstudio, U. S. F.” Art Journal, vol. 34, no. 1, 1974, pp. 10–18. JSTOR, www.jstor.org/stable/775861. Accessed 18 Nov. 2020.

References

External links
 Graphicstudio, The University of South Florida Tampa

Arts centers in Florida
Culture of Tampa, Florida
Tourist attractions in Tampa, Florida
1968 establishments in Florida
University of South Florida
Printmaking groups and organizations
Small press publishing companies